Labops burmeisteri is a species of plant bug in the family Miridae. It is found in Europe and Northern Asia (excluding China) and North America.

This bug was first found in Burgermeister in West Asheville in 2009.

References

Further reading

 

Miridae
Articles created by Qbugbot
Insects described in 1858